Basement Birds were an Australian indie pop rock group which formed in mid-2009 and comprised four singer-songwriters, Kevin Mitchell (of Jebediah, aka Bob Evans), Steve Parkin (ex-Vinyl, Autopilot, solo), Josh Pyke (ex-An Empty Flight, solo) and Kavyen Temperley (of Eskimo Joe). The members' mutual love of lush vocal harmonies and alt-country style was the basis for forming the project. Mitchell, Parkin and Temperley had each developed their careers in Perth.

Influences cited by the band include Crosby, Stills, Nash & Young and Wilco. Their first single, "Waiting for You" was debuted on Australian radio station Triple J's Drive program on 14 April 2010. Their sole album was released on 16 July 2010, which peaked at No. 12 on the ARIA Albums Chart. The group supported the album with a national tour, they last performed together in Perth in April 2011. At that time, Mitchell indicated that there were no plans to resume the project as each member returned to their respective groups or solo careers.

History

Formation
Kavyen Temperley, singer-songwriter and bass guitarist for Eskimo Joe, proposed the idea of working in a harmony-driven group, which eventually resulted in Basement Birds, with fellow singer-songwriters when Josh Pyke (ex-An Empty Flight, solo) joined a national tour with Eskimo Joe. During 2008 Kevin Mitchell (singer-songwriter-guitarist of Jebediah) was working on his solo project as Bob Evans. In his backing band was Steve Parkin (ex-Vinyl, Autopilot, solo), another singer-songwriter and a lead guitarist.

The four members discussed joining together over phone calls and emails. The initial vision was to record acoustic-based music which referenced their mutual influences of Crosby, Stills, Nash & Young and Wilco. Mitchell and Parkin started writing what would become the group's first single, "Waiting for You". Meanwhile, Pyke and Temperley had penned a track, "Reasons". Eventually both tracks were credited to all four members.

From mid-2009 Basement Birds started recording in four-week blocks at Temperley's home studio in Hamilton Hill, a Perth suburb.

"Waiting for You", the first single by Basement Birds, was released on 26 April 2010. It had been first aired by The Doctor aka Lindsay McDougall on the Drive program of national radio station, Triple J, on 14 April. Pyke revealed, in an accompanying interview, that the group hoped to tour in mid-2010.

The content of the group's debut album was released via iTunes digital downloads in the form of three extended play bundles and two singles, every couple of weeks. Carmine Pascuzzi of Mediasearch declared the bundles were "an Australian first." The initial such bundle included "Reasons", "Skin of the Sky" and "Bus Stop" (the latter featuring Julia Stone on guest vocals), which was released on iTunes on 17 May 2010.

Their self-titled album was physically released on 16 July and added the CD-only track, "All I Want", to the previously issued material. Aside from its four core members the session musicians were Rachael Aquilina on violin; Malcolm Clark on drums and percussion; Hugh Jennings on flute; Lee Jones on guitars, lap steel guitar and piano; Lucky Oceans on pedal steel guitar; Joel Quartermain on electric guitar; Shaun Luke Sibbes on drums and percussion; and Stone on guest vocals. It was co-produced by Basement Birds with Andy Lawson for Inertia Records.

AllMusic's Alexey Eremenko described it as "a good record anyway, full of nice vocal harmonies and acoustic guitar strumming, but not devoid of dynamics." Basement Birds peaked at No. 12 on the ARIA Albums Chart. Three iTunes exclusive acoustic sessions were also released in mid-2010. The group also provided a cover version of The Presets' single, "My People", for Triple J's "Like a Version" segment on 23 July.

Basement Birds supported the album with a national tour during August and September in 2010, thereafter gigs were intermittent and they last performed together in Perth in April 2011. At that time, Mitchell indicated that there were no plans to resume the group. Following the completion of the Basement Birds project, Mitchell rejoined Jebediah for its fifth album, Kosciuszko (15 April 2011), Temperley rejoined Eskimo Joe for its fifth album, Ghosts of the Past (12 August), Pyke resumed his solo career, releasing his third studio album, Only Sparrows (19 August), and Parkin relocated to Melbourne. Both Mitchell and Parkin signed to the publishing company, Select Music, in 2012.

Members
 Kevin Mitchell  – lead vocals, backing vocals, acoustic guitar (2009–11)
 Steve Parkin  – lead vocals, backing vocals, toy piano (2009–11)
 Josh Pyke  – lead vocals, backing vocals, acoustic guitar (2009–11)
 Kavyen Temperley  – lead vocals, backing vocals, upright bass (2009–11)

Discography

Studio albums

Extended plays

Singles

Awards

AIR Awards
The Australian Independent Record Awards (commonly known informally as AIR Awards) is an annual awards night to recognise, promote and celebrate the success of Australia's Independent Music sector.

|-
| AIR Awards of 2010
|themselves  
| Most Popular Independent Artist
| 
|-

ARIA Music Awards
The ARIA Music Awards is an annual awards ceremony that recognises excellence, innovation, and achievement across all genres of Australian music. They commenced in 1987.

! 
|-
|2010
| Basement Birds
| ARIA Award for Best Adult Alternative Album
| 
|
|-

References

External links

 
 "Introducing the Basement Birds" at Soulshine
 "Introducing Basement Birds" at FasterLouder
 "Music News" at Triple J

Western Australian musical groups
Musical groups established in 2009
Musical groups disestablished in 2011